This is a list of earthquakes in 1997. Only earthquakes of magnitude 6 or above are included, unless they result in damage or casualties, or are notable for some other reason. All dates are listed according to UTC time. Maximum intensities are indicated on the Modified Mercalli intensity scale, and all data are sourced from the United States Geological Survey.

By death toll

At least 10 dead.

By magnitude

At least 7.0 magnitude.

By month

January

February

March

April

May

June

July

August

September

October

November

December

References

1997
1997
1997 earthquakes
1997-related lists